Masha Gessen (born 13 January 1967) is a Russian-American journalist, author, translator and activist who has been an outspoken critic of the president of Russia, Vladimir Putin, and the former president of the United States, Donald Trump.

Gessen is nonbinary and trans and uses they/them pronouns. Gessen has written extensively on LGBT rights. Described as "Russia's leading LGBT rights activist," they have said that for many years they were "probably the only publicly out gay person in the whole country." They now live in New York with their wife and children.

Gessen writes primarily in English but also in their native Russian. In addition to being the author of several non-fiction books, they have been a prolific contributor to such publications as The New York Times, The New York Review of Books, The Washington Post, the Los Angeles Times, The New Republic, New Statesman, Granta, Slate, Vanity Fair, Harper's Magazine, The New Yorker, and U.S. News & World Report. Since 2017, they have been a staff writer for The New Yorker.

Gessen worked as a translator on the FX TV channel historical drama The Americans.

Early life and education
Gessen was born into a Jewish family in Moscow to Alexander and Yelena Gessen. Gessen's paternal grandmother Ester Goldberg, the daughter of a socialist mother and a Zionist father, was born in Białystok, Poland, in 1923 and emigrated to Moscow in 1940. Ester's father Jakub Goldberg was murdered during the Holocaust in 1943, either in the Białystok Ghetto or a concentration camp. Ruzya Solodovnik, Gessen's maternal grandmother, was a Russian-born intellectual who worked as a censor for the Stalinist government until she was fired during an antisemitic purge. Gessen's maternal grandfather Samuil was a committed Bolshevik who died during World War II, leaving Ruzya to raise Yelena alone.

In 1981, when Gessen was a teenager, Gessen's family moved via the US Refugee Resettlement Program to the United States. As an adult in 1991, Gessen moved to Moscow, where they worked as a journalist. They hold both Russian and US citizenship. Their brothers are Keith, Daniel and Philip Gessen.

Career

Activism and journalism

Gessen was on the board of directors of the Moscow-based LGBT rights organization Triangle between 1993 and 1998.

In an extensive October 2008 profile of Vladimir Putin for Vanity Fair, Gessen reported that the young Putin had been "an aspiring thug" and that "the backward evolution of Russia began" within days of his inauguration in 2000.

At the Sydney Writer's Festival in 2012, Gessen expressed their view that the institution of marriage shouldn't exist. They said: "Fighting for gay marriage generally involves lying about what we're going to do with marriage when we get there. Because we lie that the institution of marriage is not going to change, and that is a lie. The institution of marriage is going to change and it should change, and again, I don't think it should exist."

They contributed several dozen commentaries on Russia to The New York Times blog "Latitude" between November 2011 and December 2013. Among their subjects were the banning of so-called "homosexual propaganda" and other related laws; the harassment and beating of journalists, and the depreciation in value of the ruble.

In March 2013, politician Vitaly Milonov promoted the Russian law against foreign adoption of Russian children by saying: "The Americans want to adopt Russian children and bring them up in perverted families like Masha Gessen's."

Dismissal from Vokrug sveta
Gessen was dismissed from their position as the chief editor of Russia's oldest magazine, Vokrug sveta, a popular-science journal, in September 2012 after Gessen refused to send a reporter to cover a Russian Geographical Society event about nature conservation featuring President Putin because Gessen considered it political exploitation of environmental concerns. After Gessen tweeted about their firing, Putin phoned them and claimed he was serious about his "nature conservation efforts." At his invitation, Gessen met him and Gessen's former publisher at the Kremlin, and were offered their job back. Gessen rejected the offer.

Radio Liberty
In September 2012, Gessen was appointed as director of the Russian Service for Radio Liberty, a U.S. government-funded broadcaster based in Prague. Shortly after their appointment was announced and a few days after Gessen met with Putin, more than 40 members of Radio Liberty's staff were fired. The station also lost its Russian broadcasting license several weeks after Gessen took over. The degree of Gessen's involvement in both of these events is unclear, but has caused controversy.

Return to the US
In December 2013, they moved to New York because Russian authorities had begun to talk about taking children away from gay parents. In March of that year, "the St Petersburg legislator [Milonov] who had become a spokesman for the law [against 'homosexual propaganda' towards children] started mentioning me and my 'perverted family' in his interviews," and Gessen contacted an adoption lawyer asking "whether I had reason to worry that social services would go after my family and attempt to remove my oldest son, whom I adopted in 2000." The lawyer told Gessen "to instruct my son to run if he is approached by strangers and concluding: 'The answer to your question is at the airport.'" In June 2013, Gessen was beaten up outside of the Parliament; they said of the incident that "I realized that in all my interactions, including professional ones, I no longer felt I was perceived as a journalist first: I am now a person with a pink triangle." They stated that "a court would easily decide to annul Vova's adoption, and I wouldn't even know it." Given this potential threat to their family, Gessen "felt like no risk was small enough to be acceptable," they later told the CBC Radio. "So we just had to get out."
 
In a January 2014 interview with ABC News, Gessen said that the Russian gay propaganda law had "led to a huge increase in antigay violence, including murders. It's led to attacks on gay and lesbian clubs and film festivals...and because these laws are passed supposedly to protect children, the people who are most targeted or have the most to fear are LGBT parents."

Gessen wrote in February 2014 that Citibank had closed their bank account because of concern about Russian money-laundering operations.

, Gessen serves as Distinguished Writer in Residence at Bard College. Previously at Amherst College, they were named the John J. McCloy '16 Professor of American Institutions and International Diplomacy for the 2017–18 and 2018–19 academic years. In October 2017, they published their 10th book The Future is History: How Totalitarianism Reclaimed Russia. They were included in the 2022 Fast Company Queer 50 list.

Personal life
Gessen married Svetlana Generalova, a Russian citizen who was also involved in the LGBT movement in Moscow, in 2004. The wedding took place in the U.S. Generalova and Gessen later divorced, and by the time Gessen returned to the U.S. from Russia in December 2013, Gessen was married to Darya Oreshkina.
 
Gessen has three children—two sons and a daughter. Their eldest son, Vova, was born in 1997 in Russia and was adopted by Gessen from an orphanage in Kaliningrad for the children of HIV-positive women. Their daughter, Yolka, was born to Gessen in the U.S. in 2001. Their third child, a son, was born in February 2012.

Gessen tested positive for the BRCA mutation that is correlated with breast cancer and underwent a mastectomy in 2005.

Awards
 2005: National Jewish Book Award for Ester and Ruzya: How My Grandmothers Survived Hitler's War and Stalin's Peace 
2012: Stora Journalistpriset (Swedish Grand Prize for Journalism), Guest of Honor
 2013: Liberty Media Corporation, Media for Liberty award for their article "The Wrath of Putin," published in the April 2012 edition of Vanity Fair
 2015: University of Michigan Wallenberg Medal, 24th recipient
2017: National Book Award for Nonfiction for The Future Is History: How Totalitarianism Reclaimed Russia
2018: Hitchens Prize

Summaries of select works

The Man Without a Face: The Unlikely Rise of Vladimir Putin

In The Man Without a Face, Gessen offers an account of Putin's rise to power and summary of recent Russian politics. The book was published on 1 March 2012 and translated into 20 languages.

The New York Review of Books described the book as written in "beautifully clear and eloquent English," and stated that it was "at heart a description of th[e] secret police milieu" from which Putin originated and was "also very good at evoking…the culture and atmosphere within which [Putin] was raised, and the values he came to espouse." The Guardian called the book "luminous"; the Telegraph called it "courageous".

CIA officer John Ehrman's review stated: "As a biography it is satisfactory, but no more than that" and "little of what Gessen has to say is new." He described the images as ". . effective as anti-Putin propaganda".

Words Will Break Cement: The Passion of Pussy Riot

A.D. Miller wrote in the Telegraph that "even readers who do not share Gessen's esteem for Pussy Riot as artists will be convinced of their courage." Miller described Gessen as "the right person to tell this story" and said their journalistic approach was "scrupulous and sensitive". Booklist described the book as "prickly, frank, precise, and sharply witty." The New York Times called it "urgent" and "damning." The Washington Post called the book an "excellent" portrait of Pussy Riot and said that "Gessen gives a particularly brilliant account of their trials". The Los Angeles Times said that Gessen was "Not just a keen observer of these events" but "also an impassioned partisan."

The Brothers: The Road to an American Tragedy

Published in April 2015 by Riverhead, The Brothers investigates the background of Dzhokhar and Tamerlan Tsarnaev, the perpetrators of the Boston Marathon bombing.

Bibliography

Books
 
 
 
  - also known in the UK as Two Babushkas: How My Grandmothers Survived Hitler's War and Stalin's Peace
  - a New York Times Notable Book of the year
  - about Grigori Perelman
  - Short-listed for Pushkin House Russian Book Prize 2013, Long-listed for Samuel Johnson Prize for Non-Fiction 2012
 
 
 
 
  - 2017 National Book Award for nonfiction

Essays and reporting
 
 
 
 
 
 
 Articles from The New Yorker

See also
 LGBT rights in Russia
 Russia under Vladimir Putin

External Links
 (March 11, 2023). What We Talk About When We Talk About Trans Rights (an interview with David Remnick), The New Yorker.

References

External links

 
 
 
 Bloomsbury Books author pages
 "The Wrath of Putin" re: Russian prime minister's relationship with Mikhail Khodorkovsky, Vanity Fair, April 2012.
 "A Call from the Kremlin" re: face-to-face meeting with Russian President Vladimir Putin, The New York Times, September 2012.
 "Putin Biography Chronicles Rise Of A 'Street Thug'", interview with Dave Davies on Fresh Air, 1 March 2012.
 Review of Blood Matters, The Independent
 Review of "Words Will Break Cement: The Passion of Pussy Riot"
 

1967 births
20th-century American non-fiction writers
20th-century American writers
20th-century Russian writers
21st-century American non-fiction writers
21st-century American writers
21st-century Russian writers
American people of Polish-Jewish descent
American people of Russian-Jewish descent
American women journalists
Jewish American journalists
Jewish Russian writers
Transgender academics
Transgender Jews
American non-binary writers
American transgender writers
American LGBT journalists
Russian LGBT journalists
Russian LGBT rights activists
Russian LGBT writers
Russian transgender people
Russian non-binary people
Living people
National Book Award winners
Non-binary journalists
Non-binary activists
People with acquired American citizenship
Russian Jews
Russian women journalists
Russian people of Polish-Jewish descent
Russian translators
Soviet emigrants to the United States
The New Yorker people
Writers from Moscow
Transgender journalists
Transgender non-binary people
20th-century American women writers
21st-century American women writers
20th-century Russian women
21st-century American Jews